Arroio Grande (Portuguese meaning the big stream) is a Brazilian municipality in the southern part of the state of Rio Grande do Sul. The population is 18,238 (2020 est.) in an area of 2513.60 km². Its second industry is agriculture which was primary until the 1970s, it currently has more urban population (80%) than rural (20%).  Much of the area is made up of plains.

History

The settlement was founded in 1803, around eighteen years before independence by Manuel Jerônimo de Sousa, who was Baron of Mauá's grandfather.  In the right bank, the Ferreira family halted the construction, on the right bank, the sons of Manuel de Sousa Gusmão constructed secretly a ranch.

Under law 54 of May 26, 1846, it was lifted to a parish as Nossa Senhora da Graça de Arroio Grande. Under law 596 on January 2, 1867, the municipality of Jaguarão was divided into five districts, one of which was Arroio Grande.

Under the provincial law 843 on March 24, 1873, it became a town with a same name.  Under law 590 on November 5, 1890, it became a city with the name Federação, but on July 6, 1891, under law 522, it was renamed to Arroio Grande.

In 1959, the municipality lost part of its area which became the new municipality of Pedro Osório.

Districts
 Arroio Grande
 Mauá
 Pedreiras
 Santa Izabel do Sul

Bounding municipalities

Capão do Leão
Herval
Jaguarão
Pedro Osório
Rio Grande

Streams

 Arroio Grande
 Arroio Chasqueiro
 Arroio Bretanhas
 Arroio Parapó

All streams empty into Lagoa Mirim.

Demographics

Climate

Arroio Grande has one of the coolest climate in Brazil, its climate is subtropical, its medium annual temperature is 17.5 °C.

Economy

Its main agricultural products are rice, soy, wheat, corn and a few more, cattle includes bovines and ovine.

Data: IBGE/2004

Transportation

Arroio Grande is connected with the national road BR-116, one of the main roads of Mercosul, and additionally the state roads RS-602 and RS-473.

Education 

 Escola Estadual Ministro Francisco Brochado da Rocha
 Escola Estadual Cândida Silveira Haubman
 Escola Estadual 20 de Setembro
 Instituto de Educação Aimone Soares Carriconde
 Escola Municipal de Ensino Fundamental Presidente João Goulart

See also
 Irineu Evangelista de Souza (Baron of Mauá).
 Gumercindo Saraiva
 Uladislau Herculano de Freitas

References

External links
 Official website of the prefecture
 Terra de Mauá Portal
https://web.archive.org/web/20070930210757/http://www.citybrazil.com.br/rs/arroiogrande/ 

Municipalities in Rio Grande do Sul